The 2002 Sacramento State Hornets football team represented California State University, Sacramento as a member of the Big Sky Conference during the 2002 NCAA Division I-AA football season. Led by John Volek in his eighth and final season as head coach, Sacramento State compiled an overall record of 5–7 with a mark of 3–4 in conference play, placing in a four-way tie for fourth in the Big Sky. The team was outscored by its opponents 380 to 325 for the season. The Hornets played home games at Hornet Stadium in Sacramento, California.

Volek finished his tenure at Sacramento State with a record of 31–57–1, for a .354 winning percentage.

Schedule

References

Sacramento State
Sacramento State Hornets football seasons
Sacramento State Hornets football